Judge Jordan may refer to:

Adalberto Jordan (born 1961), judge of the United States Court of Appeals for the Eleventh Circuit
Daniel P. Jordan III (born 1964), judge of the United States District Court for the Southern District of Mississippi
Kent A. Jordan (born 1957), judge of the United States Court of Appeals for the Third Circuit
Robert Leon Jordan (born 1934), judge of the United States District Court for the Eastern District of Tennessee
Sean D. Jordan (born 1965), judge of the United States District Court for the Eastern District of Texas

See also
Justice Jordan (disambiguation)